1 Cabot Square (also known as the Credit Suisse building) is a 21-floor office building occupied by Credit Suisse in Cabot Square, Canary Wharf, London, England.

History of Project
Original plans called for a skyscraper on this site for Credit Suisse First Boston, however the slump at the end of the 1980s saw these plans scaled back.

Architect
The architect on the project was Pei Cobb Freed & Partners, and the building was completed in 1991.  The project had two management contractors Ellis Don and Sir Robert McAlpine.

Architecture
It is 89 metres tall (292 feet), with a floorspace of 50,166 square metres (164,587 square feet).

The building has large, open plates on the floor, that range in size from 64,500 square foot to 24,000 square foot in the executive offices.

It is internally connected to the west, to 20 Columbus Courtyard, which is also connected to a full-height internal link to the north, 17 Columbus Courtyard.

The building is the second largest building located at Canary Wharf, behind the Canary Wharf Tower.  The Credit Suisse building has 18 stories with an additional two stories of plant at the top.  The building also has a two-story arcade that is located at the base of the building.

Ownership
In early 2012 it was purchased by Qatar's sovereign wealth fund Qatar Investment Authority (QIA)  Subsequently, QIA considered selling it multiple times before eventually selling to KB Securities of South Korea.

The building is leased to Credit Suisse for around 20 years and part of Canary Wharf, of which QIA bought a majority in a joint venture with Brookfield Properties in 2015.

Gallery

See also
Canary Wharf
Credit Suisse

References

External links
 Official Site

Office buildings in London
Buildings and structures in the London Borough of Tower Hamlets
Canary Wharf buildings
Credit Suisse